The 12015 / 12016 New Delhi–Ajmer Shatabdi Express is a Superfast Express train of the Shatabdi Express category belonging to Indian Railways – Northern Railway zone that runs between  and Ajmer in India.

It operates as train number 12015 from New Delhi to Ajmer and as train number 12016 in the reverse direction, serving the states of Delhi, Haryana, and Rajasthan, and have priority above all other trains.

Coaches

The 12015 / 16 New Delhi–Ajmer Shatabdi Express presently has 1 AC First Class, 13 AC Chair Car & 2 End-on Generator coaches. It does not carry a pantry car but catering is arranged on board the train.

As is customary with most train services in India, coach composition may be amended at the discretion of Indian Railways depending on demand.

Service

12015 New Delhi–Ajmer Shatabdi Express covers the distance of 444 kilometres in 06 hours 45 mins (66 km/hr) & in 06 hours 55 mins as 12016 Ajmer–New Delhi Shatabdi Express (64 km/hr).

Routing

The 12015 / 16 New Delhi–Ajmer Shatabdi Express runs from New Delhi via Gurgaon,  to Ajmer.

Being a Shatabdi-class train, it returns to its originating station New Delhi at the end of the day.

Traction

As the route is now fully electrified, a Ghaziabad-based WAP-5 / WAP-7 locomotive powers the train for its entire journey.

Timings

12015 New Delhi–Ajmer Shatabdi Express leaves New Delhi on a daily basis at 06:10 hrs IST and reaches Daurai at 12:55 hrs IST the same day.
12016 Ajmer–New Delhi Shatabdi Express leaves Ajmer on a daily basis at 15:45 hrs IST and reaches New Delhi at 22:40 hrs IST the same day.

References

External links

Shatabdi Express trains
Rail transport in Delhi
Rail transport in Haryana
Rail transport in Rajasthan
Transport in Ajmer
Transport in Delhi